The 1992–93 NBA season was the 76ers 44th season in the National Basketball Association, and 30th season in Philadelphia. The Sixers received the ninth pick in the 1992 NBA draft, and selected Clarence Weatherspoon out of Southern Miss. During the off-season, the team acquired Jeff Hornacek, Andrew Lang and Tim Perry from the Phoenix Suns, and hired Doug Moe as their new head coach. The Sixers got off to a bad start, losing 11 of their first 14 games after a 7-game losing streak between November and December, and held an 18–31 record at the All-Star break. The team also suffered two defeats that were greater than 50 points (at Kings 154–98 on Jan. 2, and at Sonics 149–93 on Mar. 6). As the NBA in the 1990s emphasized more defensive play, Moe tried to implement an up-tempo attack offense similar to his former Denver Nuggets team of the 1980s, which failed miserably. With the team holding a 19–37 record in early March, he was fired and replaced with Fred Carter. Moe would return to coaching with the Denver Nuggets in his second stint under head coach George Karl from 2005 until retirement in 2008.

On March 28, during a nationally televised broadcast game between the Suns and the Sixers, former 76ers forward Charles Barkley received a standing ovation from his former home fans at The Spectrum. When the Sixers team was introduced, the crowd booed loudly at them; the Suns won the game, 110–100. During the final month of the regular season, the Sixers signed undrafted free agent Thomas Jordan, who played in the final four games averaging 11.0 points, 4.8 rebounds and 1.3 blocks per game. The Sixers lost 26 of 30 games between January 30 and April 2, and finished sixth in the Atlantic Division with a 26–56 record.

Hersey Hawkins led the team with 20.3 points and 1.7 steals per game, while Hornacek averaged 19.1 points, 6.9 assists and 1.7 steals per game, and Weatherspoon provided the team with 15.6 points and 7.2 rebounds per game, and was named the NBA All-Rookie Second Team. In addition, Armen Gilliam provided with 12.4 points and 5.9 rebounds per game, while Perry averaged 9.0 points and 5.0 rebounds per game, Johnny Dawkins contributed 8.9 points and 4.1 assists per game off the bench, Ron Anderson contributed 8.1 points per game also off the bench, and Manute Bol led the team with 2.1 blocks per game.

Following the season, Hawkins was traded to the Charlotte Hornets, while Gilliam and Anderson both left for free agency and signed with the New Jersey Nets, Lang signed with the Atlanta Hawks, Bol signed with the Miami Heat, and Jordan, Charles Shackleford and Greg Grant were all released. Jordan would return to playing basketball overseas, ending his short lived stint in the NBA.

NBA Draft

Roster

Regular season

Season standings

y - clinched division title
x - clinched playoff spot

z - clinched division title
y - clinched division title
x - clinched playoff spot

Record vs. opponents

Player statistics

Awards and Records
Clarence Weatherspoon, NBA All-Rookie Team 2nd Team

See also
1992–93 NBA season

References

Philadelphia 76ers seasons
Philadelphia
Philadelphia
Philadelphia